Anne McHardy Parker (1770-1840s) was the wife of Richard Parker, the "President of the Fleet" during the 1797 Nore mutiny.  She is known primarily for her efforts to prevent her husband's execution, then after failing this, for her efforts to see his body honored and decently buried. The Nore and related mutinies were part of a decade long series of agitations, protests and revolts concerning conditions of service in the navy, chiefly that pay had not increased from 1653 levels, the impressment of sailors to keep the navy manned, the fact shore leave was forbidden and dis-satisfaction with on-board conditions.

Background 

The Parkers were married in 1791. Richard Parker was the son of a grain merchant and he attended Exeter School, giving him a level of education and prestige above his fellow sailors. Anne was the daughter of a Braemar farmer, growing up near Aberdeen, Scotland.

Richard Parker's execution 

On 13 June 1797 her husband was taken into custody at the Nore at the mouth of the Thames estuary.  Three days later as the mutiny was put down, Anne was arrested at her home in Fife by agents of the Duke of Portland,  who was Home Secretary, in charge of domestic security . She was taken to Edinburgh  and during her interrogation  claimed that her husband, like George III himself,  must be insane. When released, she managed to get to London, where she found allies who helped her prepare a petition to Queen Charlotte for royal clemency for all the prisoners of the Nore. Anne delivered the petition herself to the Queen's house on 23 June but despite a daily vigil lasting until 29 June received no reply. Her husband's hanging was set for 30 June so she went to Sheerness on the Nore, and made several attempts in the face of high military security to board the Sandwich, her husband's ship.  She was on the water in a small boat when she saw him hanged and heard the death gun boom.

The burials 
She asked unsuccessfully for the body, first at the side of the Sandwich, then from the commanding officer of the whole Nore fleet, Vice-Admiral Skeffington Ludwidge. She located the walled and secret graveyard where the Navy had buried her husband, recruited four other women to help her, dug up the coffin, got it over the wall, bribed a dung cart driver to bear it out of the military area, and had it taken to the Hoop and Horseshoe public house in London. Its presence in London led to long queues of people lining up to pay respects or satisfy their curiosity. The Duke of Portland, fearing a public funeral, had the body stolen, but word leaked out and crowds blocked the streets near the workhouse to which it had been taken. At this point, the Home Office succeeded in having the "ex-president" secretly buried at St. Mary Matfelon's church.  Anne Parker, however, discovered the location, went to the church and succeeded in having the official Christian ritual for the dead performed.

Finale 

Anne Parker died in poverty in London in the 1840s. St. Mary Matfelon was not replaced when destroyed in the German air raids of  World War II.

References 

The Great Mutiny- James Dugan, (1965)

1770 births
1840s deaths
People from Aberdeenshire